Nortel's Switch56 was a networking protocol built on top of the telephone cabling hardware of their Digital Multiplex System and other telephone switches.

The name comes from the fact that Switch56 carried 56 kbit/s of data on its 64 kbit/s lines, as opposed to most systems, including ISDN, where the entire 64 kbit/s bandwidth was available for data. The speed was a side effect of Nortel using a 2-wire cable to carry both voice and switching commands, as opposed to other systems where the command data was carried on a separate set of low-speed lines. Switch56 "folded" the two sources of data into one, placing a single bit from the command channel onto the end of every 7 bits of data, similar to the original T-carrier supervision scheme. This data was split out at the "far end" as 56 kbit/s and 8 kbit/s subchannels.

Switch56 was built on top of the basic Nortel hardware to allow computers to put data into the existing telephony network. Although slow compared to even contemporary systems, Switch56 allowed network traffic to flow not only within an office like other LAN systems, but between any branch offices that were connected using a Nortel PBX like the Meridian Norstar. This was a much easier option to install than ISDN for most offices, requiring nothing more than a Switch56 bridge to their existing network. For the LAN role new telephone terminals were produced with a RS-232C port on the back, which were then plugged into the user's computer and used with custom software. Although interesting in theory, it appears Switch56 saw little use in this role.

Network protocols
Telephone exchange equipment